Samir Ramiz oghlu Abbasov (born 1 February 1978) is a retired Azerbaijani football defender, and current manager of Sumgait.

Managerial career
On 8 October 2015, Abbasov replaced Agil Mammadov as a manager of "Sumgait" until the end of the 2015–16 season.

On 29 August 2018, Abbasov was appointed as a manager of "Zira".

Career statistics

References

External links
 Profile on Inter Baku's Official Site
 

1978 births
Living people
Azerbaijani footballers
Azerbaijan international footballers
Azerbaijani football managers
Qarabağ FK players
Sumgayit FK players
People from Sumgait
Association football defenders
FK Karvan players
Neftçi PFK players
Neftçi PFK managers
Sumgayit FK managers